The 13th Pan American Games were held in Winnipeg, Manitoba, Canada from July 23 to August 8, 1999.

Medals

Silver

Mixed Team: Karina Rocha and Germán Alves

Bronze

Women's Pole Vault: Déborah Gyurcsek

Men's Points Race: Milton Wynants

Men's Kumite (+ 80 kg): Manuel Costa

Results by event

Athletics
Néstor García 
Heber Viera 
Cristian Rosales 
Danielo Estefan 
Mónica Falcioni  
Déborah Gyurcsek

Basketball

Men's team competition
Team roster
Adrián Bertolini
Marcel Bouzout
Bruno Abratansky
Jorge Cabrera
Diego Castrillón
Diego Losada
Nicolás Mazzarino
Oscar Moglia Jr.
Pablo Morales
Luis Silveira
Martín Suárez
Hugo Vázquez
Head coach: César Somma

Canoeing
Marcelo d'Ambrosio

Cycling
Gregorio Bare  
Tomas Margaleff  
Federico Moreira 
Milton Wynants

Equestrian
Jorge Fernández
Edison Quintana  
Pablo Núñez
Federico Daners  
Federico Fernández
Fernando Amado  
Hugo Garciacelay
Ricardo Monge

Fencing
Daniel Olivera
Pablo Odella  
Florencia Navatta 
María Victoria Díaz

Football
Uruguay participated with an under-23 selection of amateur players of OFI.

Men's team competition
Team roster
Martín Góngora 
Mauro Basualdo  
Williams Airala 
Mario Pascale  
Marcos Shur 
Fernando Daghero  
Luis Maseda 
Richar Albin  
Rafael Muniz 
Sergio González  
William da Costa 
Julio Pablo Rodríguez  
Jorge Reyna 
Ruben Morán 
Andrés Larre Pérez 
Jorge Rodríguez  
Carlos González 
Mariano Bogliacino
Head coach: Luis Matosas

Gymnastics
María del Carmen Laurino
Rossina Castelli  
Eugenia Tambler

Handball

Men's team competition
Team roster
Sebastián Bolla 
Daniel Schneider  
Maximiliano Gratadoux 
Pablo Montes  
Luis Pelloni 
Gonzalo Gómez
Martín Montemurro 
Christian Van Rompaey 
Ignacio Mahia 
Gastón Balleto  
Mauricio Sapiro 
Joaquín Santoro  
Gonzalo Graña

Women's Team Competition
Team roster
Silvana Renom 
Luciana Restuccia  
María José del Campo 
Daniela Fuentes  
María del Campo 
Mercedes Amor  
Haloy Yaicouschi 
Jussara Castro  
María Crocci 
Silvana de Armas  
Sofía Griot 
Lorena Estefanell  
Lucía Curbelo

Judo
Milton Terra
Álvaro Paseyro

Karate
Manuel Costa
Pablo Layerla  
Jony Martínez
Paola Loitey

Roller Sports
Karina Rocha   
Germán Alves   
Ana Claudia Ibarra

Rowing
Martín Pesce
Jesús Posse  
Martín Simoncelli
Ruben Scarpatti
Pablo Gutiérrez

Sailing
Adolfo Carrau
Ricardo Fabini  
Roberto Fabini
Ignacio Saralegui

Shooting
Luis Méndez
Roberto Fandiño  
Luis Pérez

Swimming
Claudia Campiño
Elena Casal
Diego Gallo 
Francisco Picasso

Tennis
Enrique Dondo
Gonzalo Rodríguez

Triathlon
Bruno Nantes

Weightlifting
Sergio Lafuente   
Edward Silva

Wrestling
William Fernández

See also
 Sport in Uruguay
 Uruguay at the 2000 Summer Olympics

References

Uruguay Olympic Committee

Nations at the 1999 Pan American Games
P
1999